Diego Barrera (born March 25, 1987 in Bogotá) is a Colombian-born American soccer player who currently plays for Los Angeles Force in the National Independent Soccer Association.

Career

College and amateur

Barrera is a professional american football player from California. He attended Thousand Oaks High School, and played three years of college soccer at Loyola Marymount University, where he was named to the College Soccer News All-Freshman Third Team, the All-WCC second team and the WCC All-Freshman Team in his debut year in 2004. He transferred to the University of New Mexico prior to his senior year in 2007.

During his college career and beyond, Barrera played extensively with numerous Southern California teams in the USL Premier Development League, including the San Fernando Valley Quakes (twice), Hollywood United Hitmen and Ventura County Fusion (twice). He also made a Walmart TV commercial for the Fifa World Cup year 2010 https://www.youtube.com/watch?v=7CQr6NcpObg

Professional
Barrera signed his first professional contract in March 2011, joining USL Pro club Wilmington Hammerheads. He made his professional debut on May 14, 2011, coming on as a second-half substitute in a 3-1 win over F.C. New York.

After the season at Wilmington, he played professional indoor soccer with the Syracuse Silver Knights in the MISL, before returning to California. Barrera then joined his home town based team, amateur side Cal FC in the USASA-affiliated La Gran Liga de Oxnard based in Oxnard, California.

Year 2013 he signed his first contract in the Philippines with the first division team STALLION FC and have won the United Football League Division One Championship. He then transferred to team Soccoroo for the second quarter of 2014 and loaned by KAYA FC for the UFL CUP 2014. In year 2015 KAYA FC signed him and made a big contribution. KAYA FC won their first championship in CUP 2015.

In the following year, 2016 he moved to Bangkok, Thailand and he made a huge contribution that awarded him as the 2016 BEST PLAYER OF THE YEAR. Year 2016, he was also the Top Goalscorer with 17 goals and 14 assists in 22 games played as consistent starting line up player.

In February 2021, Barrera joined National Independent Soccer Association club Los Angeles Force.

Personal
Diego Barrera is married to  Eva Barrera (m.2014).

Diego's younger brother, Danny Barrera, is also a professional soccer player.

Honors

Club
Stallion
UFL Division 1: 2013

References

External links
 LMU profile
 New Mexico profile
 

1987 births
Living people
Colombian footballers
Footballers from Bogotá
Colombian emigrants to the United States
Colombian expatriate footballers
American soccer players
New Mexico Lobos men's soccer players
Hollywood United Hitmen players
San Fernando Valley Quakes players
Syracuse Silver Knights players
Ventura County Fusion players
Wilmington Hammerheads FC players
Cal FC players
USL League Two players
USL Championship players
United States men's youth international soccer players
Expatriate footballers in the Philippines
Soccer players from California
American sportspeople of Colombian descent
Kaya F.C. players
Stallion Laguna F.C. players
Team Socceroo F.C. players
Association football midfielders
People from Thousand Oaks, California
Sportspeople from Ventura County, California
Loyola Marymount Lions men's soccer players
Expatriate footballers in Thailand
American expatriate soccer players
American expatriate sportspeople in the Philippines
American expatriate sportspeople in Thailand
Diego Barrera
Major Indoor Soccer League (2008–2014) players